Southern Charm New Orleans (abbreviated as Southern Charm NOLA) is an American reality television series that premiered on Bravo on April 15, 2018. Developed as the second spin-off of Southern Charm, it aired two seasons.

The series chronicles the personal and professional lives of several socialites who reside in New Orleans, Louisiana.

On April 19, 2019, Bravo announced that the second season would premiere on June 2, 2019.

Cast members

Main
 Jeff Charleston
 Reagan Charleston
 Tamica Lee
 Jon Moody
 Justin Reese
 Barry Smith

Recurring
 Rachel McKenzie
 Kelsey Nichols
 Reece Thomas (season 2)

Episodes

Series overview

Season 1 (2018)

Season 2 (2019)

References

External links
 
 
 

2010s American reality television series
2018 American television series debuts
English-language television shows
Bravo (American TV network) original programming
Television shows set in New Orleans